Cinzio Filonardi (died 1534) was a Roman Catholic prelate who served as Bishop of Terracina, Priverno e Sezze (1533–1534).

Biography
On 7 November 1533, Cinzio Filonardi was appointed during the papacy of Pope Clement VII as Bishop of Terracina, Priverno e Sezze.
He served as Bishop of Terracina, Priverno e Sezze until his death in November 1534.

References

External links and additional sources
 (for Chronology of Bishops) 
 (for Chronology of Bishops) 

16th-century Italian Roman Catholic bishops
Bishops appointed by Pope Clement VII
1534 deaths